This is a list of notable business schools in Hyderabad, India. Hyderabad is the capital and largest city of the Indian state of Telangana and de jure capital of Andhra Pradesh. A business school is a university-level institution that confers degrees in business administration or management.

Business schools in Hyderabad, India

 Administrative Staff College of India – A public school started jointly by the Government of India and the representatives of industry as an autonomous institute in the year 1956 to impart training in the field of management development 
 College of Defence Management – Sponsored by India's Ministry of Defence, the school provides scientific and management education to Indian Armed Forces officers.
Engineering Staff College of India - The Engineering Staff College of India (ESCI)(established 1982) is an autonomous organ of The Institution of Engineers. School of Post Graduate Studies (SPGS), a part of Engineering Staff College of India (ESCI), was established in 2008. It is an autonomous institute approved by the All India Council for Technical Education (AICTE) & Ministry of HRD, Government of India, for awarding a two-year postgraduate diploma in Management (PGDM), PGDM (General Management).
ICFAI Business School Hyderabad - Established in 1995, and accredited by the Association to Advance Collegiate Schools of Business (AACSB), a non-profit membership organization that provides a quality certification to its member schools and their programs. It is promoted by the ICFAI Group. Ranked 25th in NIRF 2020.
 Indian School of Business – Accredited by the Association to Advance Collegiate Schools of Business (AACSB), a non-profit membership organization that provides a quality certification to its member schools and their programs, the school offers certificates in various post-graduate management programs.
Vignana Jyothi Institute of Management, Hyderabad - offers 2-year full-time postgraduate diplomas in management (PGDM). It's an autonomous institution approved by AICTE and accredited by SAQS and MBA. Established in 1993 in Hyderabad by the Vignana Jyothi Society is one of the old and top B-School in Hyderabad, Telangana and Andhra Pradesh. 
 Institute of Management Technology, Hyderabad – offers 2-year full-time residential postgraduate diplomas in management (PGDM) and 15-month weekend only executive PGDM. It also offers doctoral level fellowship programmes.
 Institute of Public Enterprise – Established in 1964, for the study of issues and policies relating to public enterprises, management education started in 1980 with the start of a three-year part-time MBA (PE) programme.
 National Institute of Agricultural Extension Management – An autonomous extension and agribusiness management institute with a focus upon agricultural economics and the provision of support and services to farmers and fishermen for practicing sustainable agriculture.
 Schulich School of Business – The business school of York University located in Toronto, Ontario, Canada, it operates a satellite campus in Hyderabad.
 School of Management Studies, University of Hyderabad (Hyderabad Central University).
 University College of Commerce & Business Management – A constituent college of Osmania University established in 1962, it is divided into the departments of Business Management and Commerce
 Woxsen School of Business – A private business school established in 2013 by Praveen Pula, an education entrepreneur.

See also

 List of educational institutions in Hyderabad (India)
 List of schools in Hyderabad, India
 List of MBA schools in India
 Education in Hyderabad

Notes

References

 
Hyderabad